The Good Parliament is the name traditionally given to the English Parliament of 1376.  Sitting in London from April 28 to July 10, it was the longest Parliament up until that time.

It took place during a time when the English court was perceived by much of the English population to be corrupt, and its traditional name was due to the sincere efforts by its members to reform the government.  It had a formidable enemy, however, in John of Gaunt, fourth son of Edward III and the effective ruler of England at the time.

In session
Parliament had not met since November 1373, 2½ years previously, because Edward III and his councilors recognised the danger of calling a parliament during a period of dissatisfaction.  
However, the need for funds was so pressing in 1376 that another parliament was necessary.

Once the members were assembled, they were determined to clean up the corrupt Royal Council.  Peter de la Mare, a knight of the shire representing Herefordshire, had been elected as Speaker by the House of Commons, and on the first day he delivered an address criticising England's recent military failures, condemning the corruption at court, and calling for close scrutiny of the royal accounts. Richard Lyons (Warden of the Mint) and Lord Latimer, who were believed to be robbing the treasury, were called before Parliament and then imprisoned. Latimer's impeachment is the earliest recorded in Parliament. The king's mistress, Alice Perrers, was called and condemned to seclusion.

John of Gaunt raised the question of the Salic law, which was the basis for the French case against Edward III's claim to the Crown of France, suggesting that the English follow the French custom, but was unable to sway the assembly to his point of view.

Meanwhile, the eldest prince of the realm, Edward the Black Prince, was dying. Having taken a house in London, he summoned both Edward III and John of Gaunt and made them swear to recognise his son, the future Richard II, as successor to Edward.  Both John and the King swore to recognise Richard, and soon after Parliament summoned Richard and acknowledged him as heir to the throne. The members were swayed by the immense prestige of Prince Edward, the country's greatest military hero at the time.

Parliament then imposed a new set of councillors on the king: Edmund Mortimer, the Earl of March; William Courtenay, Bishop of London; and William of Wykeham, Bishop of Winchester.

Parliament was dissolved in July.

Aftermath 
The following autumn, John of Gaunt attempted to undo its work. He barred the admission of the new councillors assigned to the king. He threw Peter de la Mare into prison at Nottingham.  He dismissed the new council and recalled Latimer. Alice of Perrers was restored to the company of the king. John also attacked William of Wykeham.

In 1377, John had another parliament convene, the Bad Parliament. John had the Good Parliament declared unconstitutional and its acts removed from the books. Despite this, the public treasured the memory of the reforming parliament, and bestowed upon it the name of the Good Parliament.

See also
List of parliaments of England

References

1376 in England
14th-century English parliaments
Corruption in England
Privy Council of England
Edward the Black Prince